Don Breithaupt (born April 8, 1961) is a Canadian pianist, singer/songwriter, composer, arranger, producer and author.

He received his musical education at Berklee College of Music in Boston, where he studied Jazz Composition and Arranging, and his literary education at Queen's University in Kingston, Ontario, Canada, receiving a B.A. (Honours) in English and Film Studies.

Early life
Born in Sault Ste. Marie, Ontario, Breithaupt was raised in Mississauga, Ontario, Canada (then a western suburb of Toronto) in a musical household. His father was a jazz piano enthusiast, and his mother was an accomplished classical soprano and choir director, so music was heard regularly in the home. His parents took him and his two younger brothers, who were also musically inclined, to concerts and bought them records. Breithaupt started taking piano lessons at a young age, but he discontinued the lessons at age eight. He took up the piano again at age twelve, at a time when Elton John, Billy Joel, and other piano-based pop artists were becoming radio staples. He picked up this and other music by ear, eventually developing an insider's knowledge of the work of Steely Dan, the Beatles, Chicago, and Paul Simon. He played the drums in rock bands during his high school years, but never abandoned the piano. Songwriting became his strongest interest. As an English/Film undergraduate at Queen's University in nearby Kingston, Ontario, Breithaupt spent much of his spare time at Harrison-LeCaine Hall, practicing piano, writing songs, and teaching himself the craft of arranging. He immersed himself in jazz: the Pat Metheny Group, Weather Report, and several of the pianists he had first heard as a child: Bill Evans, Oscar Peterson, and Dave Brubeck. In 1983, upon completion of his bachelor's degree, Breithaupt was awarded a full scholarship to Berklee College of Music by the Frederick Harris Music Company.

Career
As a songwriter, his work has been covered by artists including Alfie Zappacosta, Marc Jordan, Dione Taylor, Sarah Slean, Denzal Sinclaire, Patricia O'Callaghan, Wendy Lands, and Chris Smith. He has co-written three songs nominated for Juno Awards (the Canadian Grammys), and has twice been a co-winner (along with his brother Jeff) in both the American Songwriting Competition, and the International Songwriting Competition.

As a musician, he has performed with the Kim Mitchell Band, Rik Emmett, and Sass Jordan, and he leads his own group, Monkey House, which have released six albums, the most recent is the album Friday in 2019. Breithaupt recorded an album in 2006 of his own original piano compositions (with cello and acoustic guitar accompaniment) entitled Breathing Space, re-released as part of a multiple CD set called Peace: Music for Relaxation. Don and his brother Jeff, a skilled lyricist, have also made a mark in Toronto and New York City as The Breithaupt Brothers, writing classic Songbook-style compositions that they recorded with a star-studded list of vocalists (Ron Sexsmith, Emilie-Claire Barlow, Ian Thomas, Sarah Slean and more) on the album Just Passing Through: The Breithaupt Brothers Songbook Vol. II, which was released in September 2014.

In 2015, Breithaupt commenced working as the producer with well-known singer Eleanor McCain on an epic musical project to help celebrate the country of Canada's 150th birthday. The album was released on May 12, 2017 and is entitled True North: The Canadian Songbook. The album has 32 songs, all written by well-known songwriters, and features 12 arrangers, 28 guest artists, and 10 Symphony Orchestras from across Canada.

As an author, Breithaupt has written extensively on music and film, including numerous articles for the National Post, a Canadian English language newspaper. His books include Precious and Few: Pop Music in the Early '70s, and Night Moves: Pop Music in the Late '70s, which were both co-written by his brother Jeff, and Steely Dan’s Aja, Vol. 46 of Continuum Publishing's 33⅓ series of books about albums, which was published in 2007.

His work in film and television has brought him SOCAN Awards for Domestic Animated Television Series music and International Television Series music. As a TV music composer, Breithaupt's credits include writing music (along with Anthony Vanderburgh) for 72 episodes of the animated sitcom called 6teen, from 2004-2010. In 2009, the duo won a Daytime Emmy Award for Outstanding Original Song for their theme to this series. Breithaupt also wrote music for 25 episodes of the hit teen sitcom Really Me from 2011-2013, as well as for the reality television series called Pawn Stars, from 2013-2015.

Personal life
Breithaupt married Rikki Rumball, a singer/songwriter, in 1988. They played together in various projects together as musicians, including Rikki Rumball's 1996 album Strange Girl, and her 2007 album Divine Blue. For both albums, Breithaupt was producer and arranger, played keyboards, and wrote or co-wrote most of the songs. Ms. Rumball sang backup vocals on Breithaupt's Monkey House albums Welcome to the Club, True North, and Headquarters. They have two children, Miles (b. Oct. 5 1991) and Cameron (b. Jun 21 1994). Both sons are musicians. Miles studied music at York University and Humber College; Cameron studied music at Humber College. Miles is involved in multiple projects including Freestyle Ambient Project, Blutonic Choir, Babygirl, and Do Tell. Cameron co-founded the indie pop band Babygirl with his songwriting partner Kirsten Clark. Don and Rikki divorced in 2007. In 2015, Breithaupt married Maureen Dessureault, who is a schoolteacher.

References

1961 births
Living people
Berklee College of Music alumni
Canadian male singer-songwriters
Canadian singer-songwriters
Musicians from Sault Ste. Marie, Ontario
Canadian male pianists
21st-century Canadian pianists
21st-century Canadian male musicians